The Bea language, Aka-Bea, is an extinct Great Andamanese language of the Southern group. It was spoken around the western Andaman Strait and around the northern and western coast of South Andaman.

History
The Bea were one of the indigenous peoples of the Andaman Islands, one of the ten or so Great Andamanese tribes identified by British colonials in the 1860s.  Their language was closely related to the other Great Andamanese languages. They were extinct as a distinct people by 1931.

Grammar
The Great Andamanese languages are agglutinative languages, with an extensive prefix and suffix system.  They have a distinctive noun class system based largely on body parts, in which every noun and adjective may take a prefix according to which body part it is associated with (on the basis of shape, or functional association). Thus, for instance, the *aka- at the beginning of the language names is a prefix for objects related to the tongue.  An adjectival example can be given by the various forms of yop, "pliable, soft", in Aka-Bea: 
A cushion or sponge is ot-yop "round-soft", from the prefix attached to words relating to the head or heart.
A cane is ôto-yop, "pliable", from a prefix for long things.
A stick or pencil is aka-yop, "pointed", from the tongue prefix.
A fallen tree is ar-yop, "rotten", from the prefix for limbs or upright things.
Similarly, beri-nga "good" yields:
un-bēri-ŋa "clever" (hand-good).
ig-bēri-ŋa "sharp-sighted" (eye-good).
aka-bēri-ŋa "good at languages" (tongue-good.)
ot-bēri-ŋa "virtuous" (head/heart-good)

The prefixes are,

Body parts are inalienably possessed, requiring a possessive adjective prefix to complete them, so one cannot say "head" alone, but only "my, or his, or your, etc. head".

The basic pronouns are almost identical throughout the Great Andamanese languages; Aka-Bea will serve as a representative example (pronouns given in their basic prefixal forms):

'This' and 'that' are distinguished as k- and t-.

Judging from the available sources, the Andamanese languages have only two cardinal numbers — one and two — and their entire numerical lexicon is one, two, one more, some more, and all.

Samples

The following poem in Aka-Bea was written by a chief, Jambu, after he was freed from a six-month jail term for manslaughter.

 ngô:do kûk l'àrtâ:lagî:ka,
 mō:ro el:ma kâ igbâ:dàla
 mō:ro el:mo lê aden:yarà
 pō:-tōt läh.
 Chorus: aden:yarà pō:-tōt läh.

Literally:

 thou heart-sad art,
 sky-surface to there looking while,
 sky-surface of ripple to looking while,
 bamboo spear on lean-dost.

Translation:

 Thou art sad at heart,
 gazing there at the sky's surface,
 gazing at the ripple on the sky's surface,
 leaning on the bamboo spear.

Note, however, that, as seems to be typical of Andamanese poetry, the words and sentence structure have been somewhat abbreviated or inverted in order to obtain the desired rhythmical effect.

As another example, we give part of a creation myth in Oko-Juwoi, reminiscent of Prometheus:

See also
Andamanese languages

References

Agglutinative languages
Great Andamanese languages
Extinct languages of Asia
Languages of India
Languages extinct in the 1930s